Aleksandr Karapuzov (born 3 September 1955) is a Soviet ski jumper. He competed in the normal hill and large hill events at the 1976 Winter Olympics.

References

1955 births
Living people
Soviet male ski jumpers
Olympic ski jumpers of the Soviet Union
Ski jumpers at the 1976 Winter Olympics
Place of birth missing (living people)